Barrow Hill may refer to:

Barrow Hill, Derbyshire
home of Barrow Hill Engine Shed
Barrow Hill, Dorset
Barrow Hill, Essex
Barrow Hill Local Nature Reserve, West Midlands
 Barrow Hill Plantation, cotton plantation in Florida, USA
 Barrow Hill: Curse of the Ancient Circle, video game

See also 
 Creech Barrow Hill in Dorset, England